The 72nd Indian Infantry Brigade was an infantry brigade, of both the British and Indian Armies, formed in the United Kingdom in January 1941 during the Second World War. On 1 June 1943 it was re-designated as the British 72nd Infantry Brigade.

On 28 April 1943 a new 72nd Infantry Brigade was formed in India by the re-designation of the 72nd Indian Infantry Brigade, which had been formed a few weeks earlier in March 1943 as an infantry formation of the Indian Army during World War II. It was assigned to the 36th Indian Infantry Division, which became a British division on 1 September 1944.

Composition in United Kingdom 1941-1943
 13th Battalion, Royal Welch Fusiliers (21 January 1941 - 24 September 1942)
 6th Battalion, Royal Inniskilling Fusiliers (21 January 1941 - 14 January 1942)
 15th Battalion, South Staffordshire Regiment (21 January 1941 - 25 May 1942)
 4th Battalion, East Lancashire Regiment (14 January 1942 - 8 October 1942)
 11th Battalion, Devonshire Regiment (8 October 1941 - 25 May 1943)
 9th Battalion, Somerset Light Infantry (9 September 1942 - 21 May 1943)

Composition with 36th Infantry Division, India, 1943-
 6th Battalion, South Wales Borderers (28 April 1944 - 18 July 1945)
 9th Battalion, Royal Sussex Regiment(28 April 1944 - 31 August 1945)
 10th Battalion, Gloucestershire Regiment (28 April 1944 - 16 July 1945)
 30th Field Company, Indian Engineers

See also

 List of Indian Army Brigades in World War II

References

Sources
 Joslen, HF,  Orders of Battle Volume 1 United Kingdom and Colonial Formations and Units in the Second World War 1939 - 1945, London, HMSO 1960
 Foster, Geoffry, 36th Division - North Burma - 1944–45, England 1946

Military units and formations in Burma in World War II
British Indian Army brigades